Vicious is a British television sitcom shown on ITV. The series stars Ian McKellen and Derek Jacobi as Freddie and Stuart, an elderly couple who have been together for 50 years but endure a love/hate relationship. The series premiered on 29 April 2013 with 5.78 million viewers.

On 14 May 2016, McKellen and Jacobi appeared as Freddie and Stuart during the Eurovision Song Contest where they are seen watching the contest.

In 2016, the show was cancelled by ITV and a finale special aired on 16 December 2016.

Series overview
Vicious is set around the lives of ageing partners Freddie and Stuart, who have lived together in their Covent Garden flat for 49 years. Freddie was a struggling actor and Stuart worked in a bar when they first met. While Stuart is now retired and manages the household, Freddie still takes acting jobs occasionally and waits for his unlikely breakthrough. Their lives consist of entertaining their frequent guests, making sure that their aged dog Balthazar is still breathing, and hurling antagonising comments towards each other.

Cast and characters

Ian McKellen as Freddie Thornhill. Freddie has been the partner of Stuart for 48 years at the time the first series begins, and the pair have a love/hate relationship. Originally from Wigan (like McKellen in real life), Freddie is an actor on stage, television, and radio with streaky success. He briefly has a role on Downton Abbey as "Cook Staff #4" and is then offered a role on Call the Midwife. He comes to establish a father-son relationship with Ash as the series progresses. He and Stuart get married after five decades of being together in the Series 2 finale, despite briefly breaking up after Freddie lies about getting an acting job that they desperately need for the money. In the Finale special, Freddie reveals his vulnerable side when Ash leaves to go on a university scholarship in New York.
Derek Jacobi as Stuart Bixby. Stuart has been with Freddie for 48 years when the series begins, and they have a love/hate relationship. Originally from Leytonstone (like Jacobi in real life), Stuart was a manager at a bar, but he gave it up at an unspecified point in his life. Stuart was initially attracted to the much younger Ash upon meeting him, but soon Stuart, along with Freddie, assumes the role of a surrogate "grandfather" to Ash. He and Freddie marry in the Series 2 finale, having now been together for over 50 years. However, they very nearly broke up for good after Freddie lied about getting an acting job, the money from which they needed to pay for the wedding. Stuart's mother Mildred dies at the wedding, leaving Stuart distraught.
Frances de la Tour as Violet Crosby. Violet has been friends with Freddie and Stuart for many years. While sometimes being coarse or aggressive to Violet, Freddie and Stuart do actually care for her well-being, which shows when Violet journeys to Argentina to meet her internet boyfriend Ignacio, who ends up fleecing her. Violet is rather promiscuous, and when she first meets Freddie and Stuart's upstairs neighbour Ash, she becomes attracted to him. Violet is married to a low-life named Jasper in Series 2, and she hasn't seen him in months. Violet gives up on her marriage after speaking with Jasper's six ex-wives, and they divorce after he makes a scene at Freddie and Stuart's wedding. Violet briefly becomes a lesbian in the Finale special.
Iwan Rheon as Ash Weston. When Ash first moves into the apartment above Freddie and Stuart's, he introduces himself to them, and over time, Ash becomes integrated into Freddie and Stuart's circle, and becomes the subject of the affections of Violet, Freddie and Stuart's close friend. Like Freddie, Ash is from Wigan. Ash is shown to be troubled at times, as he has said that both his parents are in prison and he frequently wakes up screaming in the night. As such, Freddie and Stuart come to serve as role models for Ash. Ash tries proposing to his girlfriend Jess in Series 2, only to be turned down because she doesn't love him. He subsequently serves as Freddie's best man when he and Stuart get married. In the Finale special, Ash is offered a scholarship for a university in New York on a four-year grant, and reluctantly accepts it, saying goodbye to Freddie and Stuart.
Marcia Warren as Penelope. Penelope has been friends with Freddie and Stuart for many years, and Penelope once had a one-night stand with Stuart before the latter realised his true sexuality. Penelope appears to be suffering from senile dementia, forgetting the most basic things such as where she is or why she is there. However, she appears to be a very deep thinker, and just like her friends, comes to accept Ash with open arms. Penelope is perhaps closest to Mason, whom she once mistook for her long-dead husband, Robert.
Philip Voss as Mason Thornhill. Mason is Freddie's brother, though this isn't revealed until late into Series 2, primarily because their relationship is toxic. Mason can be just as acid-tongued as his brother, sometimes more so. Mason expresses cynical comments at Freddie and Stuart's relationship, and rarely shows compassion for anyone or anything. One exception, however, would have to be Penelope, whom he is quite close to and quite fond of.

Guest cast
Series 1
Alexandra Roach as Chloe. Chloe is introduced as the vegan girlfriend of Ash, and is also shown to be "quirky". Despite her seemingly squeaky clean relationship with Ash, the cracks begin to show at a dinner party held by Ash's neighbours Freddie and Stuart, as she continually witnesses Freddie and Stuart and becomes increasingly drunk. Eventually, she mouths off at Freddie, who is defended by Stuart, who then orders Chloe to leave. She and Ash later break up.
Hazel Douglas as Mildred. Mildred is the mother of Stuart, who frequently chats to her on the phone not out of choice, but necessity. She has no idea of Stuart's relationship with Freddie, despite the fact that they have lived together for nearly 50 years, and not only that, she is constantly vying for grandchildren from Stuart. Eventually, when Stuart's upstairs neighbour Ash accidentally invites Mildred to Freddie and Stuart's anniversary party, Stuart chooses to come out to her, causing her to collapse. She thankfully recovers, and accepts Freddie and Stuart's relationship.

Series 2
Georgia King as Jess. Jess is Ash's new girlfriend, and while Ash tries to introduce her to his surrogate family, the introduction turns weird as everyone appears to be playing a part. After the whole facade is dropped, Ash introduces Jess officially to his father-figure Freddie and his partner Stuart, and their friends Violet, Penelope, and Mason. Jess settles well into Ash's circle, and when they go to ballroom dancing classes, the whole group tags along. Freddie gives Ash his mother's wedding ring to propose to Jess with. However, Jess turns Ash down because she doesn't love him. Freddie later uses the same ring to propose to Stuart.
Celia Imrie as Lilian. Lilian is Violet's wealthy sister, and they do not share a good relationship because Lilian constantly looks down upon Violet. Violet lies to Lilian that she too has become rich after marrying Jasper. In reality, Violet and Jasper are estranged. Violet's good friends come together when Lilian drops by to spend time with her, with Stuart playing Jasper, and Stuart's partner Freddie playing a butler. The plan is very nearly ruined when Violet, Stuart, and Freddie's friend Ash comes for a visit with his girlfriend Jess, but they pass Ash off as "Jasper"'s son from a previous marriage. Lilian confesses to Violet that her husband is actually dead and that she is flat broke. A hypocritical Violet then orders Lilian to leave, and as such, Lilian never discovers Violet's true circumstances.
Jack Ashton as Theo. Theo is an instructor at Ash's local gym, who attempts to con money out of Ash's parent figures Freddie and Stuart in exchange for grueling fitness classes. Theo and his own boyfriend get close to Freddie and Stuart, until Ash warns Theo to leave them alone by threatening to tell people that Theo is five years older than he says he is. After this, Theo stays away from Freddie and Stuart.
Alexandra Roach as Chloe. Chloe is Ash's ex-girlfriend, first introduced in Series 1, who returns as Freddie and Stuart's wedding planner. Chloe appears to have her alcoholism and hypertension under control now, but becomes stressed when Stuart keeps putting her under pressure by coming with grander and costlier ideas for the wedding, even if it meant Chloe paying the happy couple money, and not vice versa. Freddie and Stuart unexpectedly break up at their joint stag-do, much to Chloe's relief.
Samuel Barnett as Young Stuart. When Stuart reminisces about when he and Freddie first moved into their apartment, the reason behind their unique relationship is revealed, as Stuart is shown to apparently be a bad tea-maker. They have their first argument, spitting insults at each other, after which they promise to never do so again, a promise which is quickly broken.
Luke Treadaway as Young Freddie. When Stuart reminisces about when he and Freddie first moved into their apartment, the reason behind their unique relationship is revealed, as Freddie is shown to be a pushover. After the couple spout insults at each other during their first argument, they pledge to never do so ever again, but this breaks down as soon as it is made.
Michael Cochrane as Jasper. Jasper is the low-life new husband of Violet. Jasper hasn't been seen by Violet for months, during which time Violet gives up on their marriage after speaking to Jasper's six ex-wives. Jasper soon reappears, and is shown to be using Violet as a cash machine and punching bag. At the wedding of Violet's friends, Freddie and Stuart, Jasper oversteps the mark, and gets punched by their other friend Ash. Jasper and Violet later get divorced.
Frances Barber as Carlotta. After Violet becomes a lesbian in the Finale special, Carlotta is introduced as her new girlfriend. Carlotta appears to be more "involved" in the relationship than Violet, and is very raunchy with her. Eventually, Violet finds a way to wriggle out of Carlotta's hold, and returns to her prior life as a promiscuous heterosexual.
Alistair Brammer as Oliver. After Freddie and Stuart's upstairs neighbour Ash leaves for America in the Finale special, Oliver moves into Ash's old flat. He appears to be a more uptight copy of Ash, as he suddenly becomes the subject of the affections of Violet, who previously was attracted to Ash.
Richard Gadd as Delivery Man. In the finale special, this delivery man makes numerous visits to Freddie and Stuart's apartment over a whole year to deliver packages to them.

Episodes

Series 1 (2013)

Christmas Special (2013)

Series 2 (2015)

Special (2016)
A one-off special, and was the show's final episode. It aired 19 June 2016 in the US, and 16 December 2016 in the UK.

Broadcast
Vicious premiered on 29 April 2013 and garnered 5.78 million viewers. The first series ended on 10 June 2013, and was released on DVD on 20 November 2013. On 23 August 2013, it was confirmed that Vicious had been renewed for a second series, which began airing on 1 June 2015 and concluded on 6 July 2015.

Starting in late June 2014, the first series began airing in the United States on various PBS stations.

It was confirmed in December 2015 that the series would be ending in 2016 with a Final Special. The special was filmed at The London Studios on the 22nd and 23 December 2015.

On 19 June 2016 the Finale Special was aired in the United States on PBS and six months later on 16 December 2016 in the UK.

Reception
Vicious was met with generally positive reviews from critics. The review aggregator website Rotten Tomatoes reports an 80% "Fresh" rating based on ten reviews which are all from American critics in 2014.

Keith Watson of Metro wrote a favourable review, calling Vicious "nostalgic fun".
	
Morgan Jeffery of Digital Spy wrote a mixed review, finding the show an "uncomfortable blend of coarse humour and '70s sitcom-style cosiness". Describing the script as "lazy", he thought that the show couldn't "decide if it wants to be edgy and rude or traditional fun for all the family", but praised the "strong" cast, ultimately awarding the series two out of five stars.

Kevin O'Sullivan of the Sunday Mirror called it a "horrible half-hour of 1970s-style net curtain cosiness" in a negative review of ITV's Monday night comedy offerings. In a 29 April 2013 review in the Telegraph, Benjamin Secher claimed it is "the least funny new comedy in recent memory", giving it 1 out of 5 stars. He also wrote that "the script fell disastrously flat". Writing in the London Evening Standard, Brian Sewell described the series as "a spiteful parody that could not have been nastier had it been devised and written by a malevolent and recriminatory heterosexual".

The series was twice nominated for the GLAAD Media Award for Outstanding Comedy Series while the finale was nominated for Outstanding TV Movie or Limited Series.

DVD release
The first series of Vicious was released on DVD in the UK on 20 November 2013 by 4DVD. The second series was released on 13 July 2015. Neither release contains the 2013 Christmas special which remains unreleased on DVD in the UK so far (though it is available on the North American release).

References

External links
 
 
 
 Official Twitter page
 

2013 British television series debuts
2016 British television series endings
2010s British LGBT-related television series
2010s British sitcoms
British LGBT-related sitcoms
English-language television shows
Gay-related television shows
ITV sitcoms
Television series about actors
Television series about couples
Television series about old age
Television series by Banijay
Television shows set in London